The Owerri prison break took place in the early hours of 5 April 2021, when a mass prison break occurred in Owerri, Imo State, Nigeria. A large armed group arrived in pickup trucks and on buses carrying rocket-propelled grenades, machine guns and rifles. The group entered the prison's yard by using explosives to break through the administrative block. The militants attempted to take over the armoury, but failed. The group released over 1,844 inmates from the jail.

The Nigerian Inspector General suspects the Eastern Security Network, the armed wing of the banned separatist group the Indigenous People of Biafra, are responsible for the attack.

President Muhammadu Buhari described the crime as an act of terrorism perpetrated by anarchists. 

The attack is part of the insurgency in Southeastern Nigeria and follows an attack in March. Over a dozen police officers and military personnel were killed in an assault on four police stations and several military checkpoints. It is believed the two attacks were perpetrated by the same group.

References

April 2021 crimes in Africa
Attacks in Southeastern Nigeria
Attacks on buildings and structures in 2021
Attacks on buildings and structures in Nigeria
Grenade attacks
Imo State
Improvised explosive device bombings in 2021
Improvised explosive device bombings in Nigeria
Insurgency in Southeastern Nigeria
Prison break
Prison escapes
Terrorist incidents in Nigeria in 2021
Attacks in Nigeria in 2021